Camargo is one of the 67 municipalities of Chihuahua, in northern Mexico. The municipal seat lies at Santa Rosalía de Camargo. The municipality covers an area of 16,066 km².

As of 2010, the municipality had a total population of 48,748, up from 47,209 as of 2005.

The municipality had 623 localities, the largest of which (with 2010 populations in parentheses) was: Santa Rosalía de Camargo (40,221), classified as urban.

The municipality has the second-largest land area in the state (after Ahumada), and is also one of the largest in all of Mexico. It is almost all very sparsely populated except for the city of Santa Rosalía de Camargo, which is the seventh-largest community in the state in population with around 40,000.

Geography

Towns and villages

References

Municipalities of Chihuahua (state)